Guido De Luigi (born 17 February 1963) is an Italian former volleyball player who competed in the 1984 Summer Olympics.

In 1984 he was part of the Italian team which won the bronze medal in the Olympic tournament. He played four matches.

External links
 profile

1963 births
Living people
Italian men's volleyball players
Olympic volleyball players of Italy
Volleyball players at the 1984 Summer Olympics
Olympic bronze medalists for Italy
Olympic medalists in volleyball
Medalists at the 1984 Summer Olympics